Opta or OPTA may refer to:

 Opta Sports, a sports data company
 Onafhankelijke Post en Telecommunicatie Autoriteit, a former Dutch government agency
 SunOpta, a Canadian food and mineral company
 OptaPlanner, a Java application
 Tarbela Dam Airport (ICAO code OPTA), an airport in Pakistan